The 2011–12 FIS Snowboard World Cup was a multi race tournament over a season for snowboarding. The season started on 28 August 2011 and ended on 17 March 2012. The World Cup was organised by the FIS which also runs world cups and championships in alpine skiing, cross-country skiing, ski jumping, Nordic combined, and freestyle skiing. The FIS Snowboarding World Cup consisted of the parallel slalom, snowboard cross and the halfpipe. The men's side of the world cup also consisted of three big air competitions.

Men

Parallel Slalom

Snowboard Cross

Halfpipe

Big Air

Slopestyle

source:

Women

Parallel Slalom

Snowboard Cross

Halfpipe

Slopestyle

source:

Standings

source:

Notes

References

External links
 FIS Snowboard World Cup calendar

FIS Snowboard World Cup
FIS Snowboard World Cup
FIS Snowboard World Cup